Aleksandr Anatolyevich Malin (born 3 February 1973) is a Russian professional football coach and a former player.

Club career
He played 8 seasons in the Russian Football National League for FC Metallurg Lipetsk, FC Volgar-Gazprom Astrakhan and FC Dynamo Bryansk.

References

1973 births
Footballers from Tambov
Living people
Soviet footballers
Russian footballers
Association football midfielders
FC Spartak Tambov players
FC Dynamo Stavropol players
FC Metallurg Lipetsk players
FC Volgar Astrakhan players
FC Dynamo Bryansk players
Russian football managers